The 2021 Zagreb local elections were the elections for the 53rd mayor of Zagreb, the two deputy mayors, the 47 members of the Zagreb Assembly, the councils of districts and the local committees. It was part of the Croatian local elections, which took place on 16 May 2021. The runoff for the mayor took place on 30 May 2021.

As Zagreb, being the national capital, is the only Croatian city to enjoy a special status within Croatia's regional administrative framework (being both a city and a county), the mayor of Zagreb likewise also enjoys a status equal to that of a county prefect of one of Croatia's other 20 counties. The city's county-level status is also highlighted in the name of its legislature, which is uniquely styled as a city assembly (a term reserved for units with regional self-government, i.e. counties), and not as a city council (which is used for units with local self-government, i.e. cities and municipalities).

The elections followed in the wake of the late February death of long-time Zagreb mayor Milan Bandić. Since the start of the campaign, and especially in May 2021, polling for mayor had consistently placed left-wing social activist and environmental researcher, Tomislav Tomašević, clearly in the lead, with 30–40 percent of the vote (as was also the case with his Green–Left Coalition in the Assembly election). Meanwhile, the candidates of Croatia's two major parties – the HDZ and the SDP, were well behind, as were conservative musician-turned-politician Miroslav Škoro, acting mayor Jelena Pavičić Vukičević and former Minister of Justice Vesna Škare-Ožbolt. In the week leading up to the election, several candidates filed charges against one of the polling agencies, Akter Public, accusing it of influencing public opinion to benefit Miroslav Škoro over several other candidates. Akter Public issued a denial, while Škoro's Homeland Movement admitted that it had engaged in business transactions with Akter Public.

The first round of the mayoral election, held on 16 May 2021, was convincingly won by leftist candidate Tomislav Tomašević (with 45.15%), while right-wing nationalist Miroslav Škoro finished a distant second (with 12.16%). Furthermore, Tomašević's number of votes is the highest of any first round candidate since the introduction of direct mayoral elections in 2009. However, as no candidate received a majority of the votes, a run-off took place on 30 May 2021. Tomašević was elected mayor with 63.87% of the vote, against Škoro's 34.01%. In addition, just as was the case in the first round, Tomašević's second round performance once more set a new record for the number of votes received by a mayor candidate in Zagreb. Namely, his almost 200 thousand votes was larger by nearly 30,000 than that which Milan Bandić received in the second round of the 2013 election.

Meanwhile, in the Assembly election, the Green–Left Coalition won 23 of out the 47 seats (thus falling just one seat short of an overall majority), and later entered into a coalition with the centre-left Social Democratic Party, which won 5 seats.

Background 

The longest-serving and six-time elected mayor of Zagreb, Milan Bandić, died from a heart attack on 28 February 2021, less than three months before the election. Following his death, one of the deputy mayors, Jelena Pavičić Vukičević, temporarily assumed the powers and duties of mayor. Also, she became the acting president of the Bandić's Labour and Solidarity Party. It will thus be the first time since the 1997 elections that Bandić won't be running for the mayorship.

The Croatian government officially called the election on 14 April 2021, with the potential candidates then having two weeks to collect the number of signatures required by the Law on Local Elections.

Campaign

Pre-election period and first round
The election is taking place during the global COVID-19 pandemic, which has affected more than 63,000 people in Zagreb and caused over 2,000 deaths in the city, as of May 2021. Furthermore, Zagreb is still recovering from a series of natural disasters which struck the city during 2020. Namely, a major earthquake occurred in the city on 22 March 2020 and caused extensive damage to historic buildings. Then, nine months later, an even stronger earthquake in Petrinja only further weakened already damaged structures in Zagreb. Therefore, one of the main topics of the campaign is the adoption of a law on reconstructing the affected areas of the city.

Other major campaign issues include the troubling state of the city's finances, its allegedly oversized bureaucratic apparatus, as well as the corruption, nepotism and cronyism which took place during the Bandić administration.

Second round

On the night of 16 May 2021, when it became clear that no candidate had won enough votes for an outright victory, and when it was increasingly apparent that Tomislav Tomašević and Miroslav Škoro would thus face each other in a run-off, Škoro declared to his supporters that "regardless of who will win – Jelena Pavičić Vukičević, Davor Filipović or Miroslav Škoro" he would "stand against the left, especially a left of this kind, which has often shown that it contains elements of that to which neither Croatia nor Zagreb should return". He furthermore stated that the Green–Left Coalition is "neither green nor left, but extremely left". Such statements may be signaling a campaign which will be highly ideologically polarised between progressive and traditionalist voters. Austrian Der Standard wrote that Škoro's statements polarise the right-wing voters and could cause some to turn against him in the runoff.

The Independent and German Frankfurter Allgemeine Zeitung described the unexpectedly high vote shares attained by Tomašević and We can! as an upset for the ruling Croatian Democratic Union (HDZ). The Frankfurter Allgemeine Zeitung wrote that "anything but a new victory for [Tomašević on 30 May] would be a sensation", and called the Croatian local elections a disaster for Croatia's biggest left-wing party, the SDP, which won just 8.9 percent of the vote for the Zagreb Assembly and generally performed poorly across the country. Zagreb was described as a possible "springboard" for the green politics of We can! in the national political arena, should their campaign promises be executed and should the fight against Bandić's "corruption and clientelism" succeed.

Mayoral candidates 
On 30 April 2021, the State Electoral Commission (SEC) confirmed that ten potential candidates had submitted at least 5,000 valid signatures from registered voters, and that they, as well as their running mates, had thus qualified to be official candidates for mayor and deputy mayor.

Failed candidates
The following individuals failed to submit signatures to the State Electoral Commission by the deadline on 29 April 2021.
 Ljubomir Majdandžić (Ind.), associate professor at the Faculty of Economics, University of Rijeka and a HSS member
 Marina Pavković (Ind.), architect
 Srećko Sladoljev (HČSP), physician and immunologist
 Milivoj Špika (BUZ), professor of kinesiology
 Željko Uhlir (HNS), current State Secretary of Construction, Spatial Planning and State Property

Withdrawn candidates  
These individuals withdrawn their bids as candidates for the mayor. 
 Otto Barić (Ind.), architect, son of Otto Barić
 Mirando Mrsić (Democrats), physician and a former Minister of Labour and Pension System
 Renato Petek (Ind.), member of the Zagreb Assembly
 Ivica Relković (Ind.), political analyst
Herman Vukušić (Ind.), psychiatrist

Results

Mayoral election
On 30 April 2021, the State Electoral Commission (SEC) announced that 10 candidates had presented enough valid signatures from registered voters in order to be placed on the ballot in the elections for the mayor of Zagreb.

Assembly election
On 30 April 2021, the State Electoral Commission (SEC) announced that 22 party lists, independent lists and voters' group candidate lists had presented enough valid signatures from registered voters in order to be placed on the ballot for the elections to the Zagreb Assembly.

The Zagreb City Assembly has 47 members elected by proportional representation in a single city-wide electoral constituency. In order to qualify for legislative representation, a party or coalition must receive at least 5% of the number of valid votes cast in an election. The method used to distribute seats among such parties or coalitions is the D'Hondt method.

Elected lists and candidates
Six lists received at least 5% of the valid votes cast on 16 May 2021, making them eligible to take part in the distribution of seats using the D'Hondt method. The party list with the most elected candidates was the Green-Left Coalition, followed by the coalition led by the Croatian Democratic Union, a three-way tie between the coalition led by the Homeland Movement, Bandić Milan 365 - Labour and Solidarity Party and the Social Democratic Party, and, finally, by the Bridge of Independent Lists.

The following table contains the names of the Assembly members elected from each party list. It is to be noted that if a member-elect refuses to take up his or her seat in the Assembly, or if he or she is legally prevented from doing so (e.g. because they are elected to an incompatible political office, such as mayor or deputy mayor), then the candidate who is next on the list will take office as a member of the Assembly. In this context, mayor Tomislav Tomašević, as well as his two deputies, Danijela Dolenec and Luka Korlaet, were ineligible to take up their seats in the Assembly, and were replaced by Marija Krnić, Sanja Bilas and Ana Profeta, respectively.

The Law on Local Elections permits a member of the Zagreb Assembly to simultaneously serve as a Member of the Croatian Parliament. Thus, at least seven Assembly members are currently due to hold office in both bodies during their term: Damir Bakić (We Can!), Stephen N. Bartulica (Homeland Movement), Ivana Kekin (New Left), Vilim Matula (We Can!), Urša Raukar-Gamulin (We Can!), Miroslav Škoro (Homeland Movement) and Zvonimir Troskot (Bridge of Independent Lists). Meanwhile, Rada Borić (New Left) will resign as an MP and serve only in the City Assembly. Furthermore, Tomislav Tomašević will also have to resign from Parliament before assuming office as mayor. Tomašević's parliamentary seat will be filled by Urša Raukar-Gamulin (We Can!), while Borić will be replaced by Ivana Kekin (New Left).

Due to the failure to represent the representatives of the Serbian national minority in the council, by-elections were announced for October 3, 2021 for the election of one representative of the minority. This will increase the number of representatives in the council to 48. The seat was won by Nikola Vukobratović of SDSS who run unopposed.

Councils of the city districts
During the local elections voters also had the chance to elect their representatives in the councils of each of Zagreb's 17 city districts.

* Antun Bošnjaković's list
** Krešimir Kompesak's list
*** Youth for Brezovica

Opinion polls 
Some of the polls have attracted controversy due to being commissioned by certain candidates. The first Ipsos poll which showed Pavičić Vukičević entering the second round was commissioned by the acting mayor herself. Akter Public was accused by several candidates of attempting to influence voters to vote for Miroslav Škoro in an illegal phone campaign. Two candidates filed charges against the agency. The phone number from which the illegal campaign was carried out was registered to Akter Public, according to the Croatian Regulatory Authority for Network Industries. Akter Public denied using this number. Miroslav Škoro's Homeland Movement admitted hiring the agency for purposes of media buying. Akter Public's polls showed Škoro reaching the second round of the mayoral elections.

Mayoral election

Graphical summary (first round)

Graphical summary (second round: Tomašević vs Škoro)

First round

Second round

Zagreb Assembly

Graphical summary

Bold: electoral lists which would be eligible to receive seats

See also
List of mayors in Croatia
List of mayors of Zagreb
2021 Split local elections
2021 Rijeka local elections
2021 Osijek local elections

Notes

References

External links 

Zagreb 2021
Zagreb
Elections in Zagreb
2020s in Zagreb
Zagreb local election